The 1947 Drexel Dragons football team represented the Drexel Institute of Technology (renamed Drexel University in 1970) as an independent during the 1947 college football season.  Ralph Chase was the team's head coach.

Schedule

Roster

References

Drexel
Drexel Dragons football seasons
College football winless seasons
Drexel Dragons football